This is a list of number one singles on the Billboard Brasil Hot 100 chart in 2011. Billboard publishes a monthly chart.

Chart history

References

See also
Billboard Brasil
List of Hot 100 number-one singles of 2011 (Brazil)
Crowley Broadcast Analysis

Brazil
2011 Hot 100

vi:Danh sách ca khúc nhạc pop quán quân năm 2010 (Brazil)